Rosebud may refer to:

 Rose bud, the bud of a rose flower

Arts
 The name of Jerry Garcia's guitar from 1990 until his death in 1995.
 In the 1941 film Citizen Kane, the last words of Charles Foster Kane and an overall plot device.
 "Rosebud" (The Simpsons), an episode of the television comedy The Simpsons, parodying Citizen Kane
 Rosebud (band), a folk-rock band circa 1970, featuring Judy Henske and Jerry Yester
 Rosebud (Fabergé egg)
 Rosebud (1975 film), an American film
 Rosebud (2019 film), a South Korean film
 The Rosebuds, an indie-rock band
 "Rosebud", a song by Ryan Adams from the album Cold Roses
 "Rosebud", a song by Sparks from their 1986 album Music That You Can Dance To
 "Rosebud", a song by Manic Street Preachers from their album Know Your Enemy (2022 Remastered)
 Rosebud, the attack command word for Dr. Eric Mason's Doberman Pinschers on the television crime drama season 7, episode 4 of Columbo
 Rosebud, a cheat code featured in the video game The Sims from Maxis
 The default password in the tutorial hacking mission in the video game Uplink
 Rosebud, a Splicer model in the video game BioShock
 Rosebud the Basselope, a character in the comic strip Bloom County.

Places

Australia
 Rosebud, Victoria, Australia

Canada
 Rosebud, Alberta, Canada
 Rosebud River, Canada

United States
 Rosebud Indian Reservation, a Sioux reservation in South Dakota, U.S.
 Battle of the Rosebud, a battle on June 17, 1876 between the Lakota (Sioux) and Cheyenne Indian tribes and the U.S. and their Indian allies, the Shoshone and Crow tribes
 Rose Bud, Arkansas
 Rosebud, Alabama
 Rosebud, Georgia
 Rosebud, Warrick County, Indiana
 Rosebud, Washington County, Indiana
 Rosebud, Missouri
 Rosebud, Montana
 Rosebud, North Carolina
 Rosebud, South Dakota 
 Rosebud, Texas
 Rosebud County, Montana

People
 Sasha Obama, daughter of U.S. President Barack Obama, by U.S. Secret Service codename
 Rosebud Denovo (died 1992), street activist killed by police in Berkeley, California, U.S.
 Rosebud the Basselope, a character in the comic strip Bloom County

Other uses
 PZ 87 The Rosebud, the fishing vessel that sailed to London in 1937 to protest the Newlyn Clearances
 The Rosebud (diner), a diner in Somerville, Massachusetts
 Rosebud (Schooner) that ran aground in Port Phillip Bay
 Rosebud, a euphemism for anus
 Rosebud pornography, a form of pornography
 Rose-bud torch, a type of oxy-gas torch; see oxy-fuel welding and cutting
 Rosebud Releasing Corporation, a former American studio company that produced Evil Dead II